Awa (or Hawa) is an African feminine given name derived from Eve, Notable people with the name include:

 Awa Marie Coll Seck (born 1951), Senegalese Executive Director of The Roll Back Malaria (RBM) Partnership
 Awa Dioum-Ndiaye (born 1961), Senegalese retired female track and field athlete
 Awa Gueye (born August 1978), Senegalese women's basketball player
 Awa Santesson-Sey (born 1997), Swedish singer

Hawa
 Hawa Ghasia, Tanzanian politician
 Hawa Yakubu (1948–2007), Ghanaian politician
 Zainab Hawa Bangura, Sierra Leona politician

Awa is also a New Zealand Māori word that means 'river' often used in given names or part of a name. It can appear in both female and male names. An example of this name use is; Te Awanui Reeder from the band Nesian Mystik. Te Awaunui, can be directly translated as 'The Big River' or 'The Main River'.

References